The  (Akkadian Cuneiform: , also spelled "Enuma Elish") is the Babylonian creation myth (named after its opening words). It was recovered by English archaeologist Austen Henry Layard in 1849 (in fragmentary form) in the ruined Library of Ashurbanipal at Nineveh (Mosul, Iraq). A form of the myth was first published by English Assyriologist George Smith in 1876; active research and further excavations led to near completion of the texts and improved translation.

The Enūma Eliš has about a thousand lines and is recorded in Akkadian on seven clay tablets, each holding between 115 and 170 lines of Sumero-Akkadian cuneiform script. Most of Tablet V has never been recovered, but, aside from this lacuna, the text is almost complete.

This epic is one of the most important sources revealing the Babylonian worldview. Over the seven tablets, it describes the creation of the world, a battle between gods focused on the supremacy of Marduk, the creation of man destined for the service of the Mesopotamian deities, and it ends with a long passage praising Marduk. Its primary original purpose is unknown, although a version is known to have been used for certain festivals. There may also have been a political element to the myth, centered on the legitimization or primacy of Mesopotamia over Assyria. Some later versions replace Marduk with the Assyrian primary god Ashur.

The Enūma Eliš exists in various copies from Babylon and Assyria. The version from the archaeological Library of Ashurbanipal dates to the 7th century BCE. The composition of the text probably dates to the late 2nd millennium BCE, or even earlier, to the time of Hammurabi during the Old Babylonian Period (1900–1600 BCE). Some elements of the myth are attested by illustrations that date to, at least, as early as the Kassite era (roughly 16th–12th centuries BCE).

Background and discovery 
Before the tablets were discovered, substantial elements of the myth had survived via the writings of Berossus, a 3rd-century BCE Babylonian writer and priest of Bel (Marduk). These were preserved in Alexander Polyhistor's book on Chaldean History, which was reproduced by Eusebius in Book 1 of his Chronicon. In it are described the primeval state of an abyssal darkness and water, the two primeval beings existing therein, said to be of a twofold principle. The description then relates the creation of further beings, partly human but with variants of wings, animal heads and bodies, and some with both sex organs. (Berossus states images of these are to be found at the temple of Bel in Babylon.) The text also describes a female being leading over them, named as Omoroca (Chaldean: Thalatth), and her slaying by Bel, who cut her in half, forming Heaven of one part and Earth of the other – this, Berossus claims to have been an allegory. The text also describes the beheading of a god, and the mixing of the god's blood with the Earth's soil, leading to the creation of men (people). Finally, there is also reference to Bel's creation of the stars, Sun, Moon, and planets. Berossus also gave an account of the sage Oannes, a sort of fish-man hybrid, who appeared from the sea and taught people all manner of knowledge, including writing, lawmaking, construction, mathematics, and agriculture; Berossus presented the account of creation in the form of a speech given by the Oannes. The neo-platonist Damascius also gave a short version of the Babylonian cosmological view, which closely matches the Enūma Eliš.

Clay tablets containing inscriptions relating to analogues of biblical stories were discovered by A.H. Layard, Hormuzd Rassam, and George Smith in the ruins of the Palace and Library of Ashur-bani-pal (668626 BCE) during excavations at the mound of Kuyunjik, Nineveh (near Mosul) between 1848 and 1876. Smith worked through Rassam's find of ~20,000 fragments from 1852, and identified references to the kings Shalmaneser II, Tiglath-Pileser III, Sargon II, Sennacherib, Esarhaddon, and other rulers mentioned in the Bible – furthermore he discovered versions of a Babylonian deluge myth (see Gilgamesh flood myth), as well as creation myths.

On examination it became clear that the Assyrian myths were drawn from or similar to the Babylonian ones. Additionally Sir Henry Rawlinson had noted similarities between Biblical accounts of creation and the geography of Babylonia; he suggested that biblical creation stories might have their origin in that area. A link was found on a tablet labelled K 63 at the British Museum's collection by Smith, as well as similar text on other tablets. Smith then began searching the collection for textual similarities between the two myths, and found several references to a deluge myth with an 'Izdubar' (literal translation of cuneiform for Gilgamesh). Smith's publication of his work led to an expedition to Assyria funded by The Daily Telegraph – there he found further tablets describing the deluge as well as fragmentary accounts of creation, a text on a war between good and evil 'gods', and a Fall of man myth. A second expedition by Smith brought back further creation legend fragments. By 1875 he had returned and began publishing accounts of these discoveries in the Daily Telegraph from 4 March 1875.

Smith envisioned that the creation myth, including a part describing the fall of man must have originally spanned at least nine or ten tablets. He also identified tablets that in part were closer with Borussus' account. Some of Smith's early correspondences, such as references to the stories of the temptation of Eve, to the Tower of Babel, and to instructions given from God (Yahweh) to Adam and Eve, were later held to be erroneous.

The connection with the Bible stories brought a great deal of additional attention to the tablets – in addition to Smith's early scholarship on the tablets, early translation work included that done by E. Schrader, A.H. Sayce, and Jules Oppert. In 1890 P. Jensen published a translation and commentary Die Kosmologie der Babylonier , followed by an updated translation in his 1900 "Mythen und Epen" ; in 1895 Prof. Zimmern of Leipzig gave a translation of all known fragments, shortly followed by a translation by Friedrich Delitzsch, as well as contributions by several other authors.

In 1898, the trustees of the British Museum ordered publication of a collection of all the Assyrian and Babylonian creation texts held by them, a work which was undertaken by L.W. King. King concluded that the creation myth as known in Nineveh was originally contained on seven tablets. This collection was published 1901 as "Cuneiform Texts from Babylonian Tablets in the British Museum" (Part XIII) . King published his own translations and notes in two volumes with additional material 1902 as The Seven Tablets of Creation, or the Babylonian and Assyrian Legends concerning the creation of the world and of mankind . By then additional fragments of tablet six had been found, concerning the creation of man – here Marduk was found to have made man from his blood combined with bone, which brought comparison with Genesis 2:23 ("This is now bone of my bones and flesh of my flesh; she shall be called 'woman,' for she was taken out of man") where the creation of woman required the use of a man's bone.

New material contributing to the fourth and sixth tablets also further corroborated other elements of Berossus' account. The seventh tablet added by King was a praise of Marduk, using around fifty titles over more than one hundred lines of cuneiform. Thus King's composition of the Enūma Eliš consisted of five parts – the birth of gods, legend of Ea and Apsu, Tiamat primeval serpent myth, account of creation, and finally a hymn to Marduk using his many titles. Importantly, tablets, both Assyrian and Babylonian, when possessing colophons had the number of the tablet inscribed.

Further expeditions by German researchers uncovered further tablet fragments (specifically tablet 1, 6, and 7) during the period 1902–1914 – these works replaced Marduk with the Assyrian god Ashur; additional important sources for tablets 1 and 6, and tablet 7 were discovered by expeditions in 1924–25, and 1928–29 respectively. The Ashur texts uncovered by the Germans necessitated some corrections – it was Kingu not Marduk who was killed and whose blood made men. These discoveries were further supplemented by purchases from antiquity dealers – as a result by the mid 20th century most of the text of the work was known, with the exception of tablet 5. These further discoveries were complemented by a stream of publications and translations in the early 20th century.

In the 21st century, the text remains a subject of active research, analysis, and discussion. Significant publications include: The Standard Babylonian Creation Myth Enūma Eliš ; Das Babylonische Weltschöpfungsepos Enuma Elis ; Babylonian Creation Myths ; enūma eliš: Weg zu einer globalen Weltordnung ; and other works still.

Dating of the myth 

King's set of tablets were no older than the 7th century BCE, being from the library of Ashurbanipal at Nineveh. However, King proposed that the tablets were copies of earlier Babylonian works, since they primarily glorified Marduk (of Babylon), and not the Assyrians' favored god Ashur. King also proposed that sculptures found at the temple of Ninib at Nimrud depicted Marduk fighting Tiamat, thus dating the dragon legend to at least the reign of Ashurnasirpal II (883–859 BCE), two centuries earlier than Ashurbanipal's library.

The evidence that this represents Marduk and Tiamat is weak, as is the evidence for most posited depictions of the epic. Nonetheless, most scholars now ascribe an even earlier date to the epic's composition. Legends of Tiamat and her monsters existed much earlier, as far as the Kassite ruler Agum I, ~17th C. BCE.

It has been suggested that the myth, or at least the promotion of Marduk in it, dates to the ascendancy of the First Babylonian dynasty (1894–1595 BCE), during the same period that Marduk became a national god. A similar promotion of Marduk is seen in the first lines of the Code of Hammurabi (c. 1754 BCE).

Variants 
Numerous copies of the tablets exist – even by 1902 fragments of four copies of the first tablet were known, as well as extracts, possibly examples of 'handwriting practice'. Tablets from the library of Ashur-bani-pal tended to be well written on fine clay, whereas the Neo-Babylonian tablets were often less well written and made, though fine examples existed. All tablets, both Assyrian and Babylonian had the text in lines, not columns, and the form of the text was generally identical between both.

A tablet at the British Museum (No 93014.), known as the "bilingual" version of the creation legend describes the creation of man, and animals (by Marduk with the aid of Aruru), as well as the creation of the rivers Tigris and Euphrates, of land and plants, as well as the first houses and cities.

Text 

The epic itself does not rhyme, and has no meter – it is composed of couplets, usually written on the same line, occasionally forming quatrains. The title Enūma Eliš, meaning "when on high", is the incipit.

The following per-tablet summary is based on the translation in Akkadian Myths and Epics (E.A. Speiser), in Ancient Near Eastern Texts Relating to the Old Testament

Tablet 1 

The tale begins before creation, when only the primordial entities Apsu and Tiamat existed, co-mingled together. There were no other things or gods, nor had any destinies been foretold. Then from the mixture of Apsu and Tiamat two gods issued – Lahmu and Lahamu; next Anshar and Kishar were created. From Anshar came firstly the god Anu, and from Anu, came Nudimmud (also known as Ea).

The commotion of these new gods disturbed and disgusted Tiamat, and Apsu could not calm them. Apsu called Mummu to speak with Tiamat, and he proposed to destroy the new gods, but Tiamat was reluctant to destroy what they had made. Mummu advised Apsu to destroy them, and he embraced Mummu. The new gods heard of this and were worried – Ea however crafted a spell to lull Apsu to sleep.

Mummu sought to wake Apsu but could not – Ea took Apsu's halo and wore it himself, slew Apsu, and chained Mummu. Apsu became the dwelling place of Ea, together with his wife Damkina. Within the heart of Apsu, Ea and Damkina created Marduk. The splendor of Marduk exceeded Ea and the other gods, and Ea called him "My son, the Sun!". Anu created the four winds.

Other gods taunted Tiamat: 'When your consort (Apsu) was slain you did nothing', and complained of the wearisome wind. Tiamat then made monsters to battle the other gods, eleven chimeric creatures with weapons, with the god Kingu chief of the war party and her new consort. She gave Kingu the 'Tablet of Destinies', making his command unchallengeable.

Tablet 2 

Ea heard of Tiamat's plan to fight and avenge Apsu. He spoke to his grandfather Anshar, telling that many gods had gone to Tiamat's cause, and that she had created eleven monstrous creatures fit for war, and made Kingu their leader, wielding the 'Tablet of Destinies'. Anshar was troubled and told Anu to go to appease Tiamat, but he was too weak to face her and turned back. Anshar became more worried, thinking no god could resist Tiamat.

Finally, Anshar proposed Marduk as their champion. Marduk was brought forth, and asked what god he must fightto which Anshar replied that it was not a god but the goddess Tiamat. Marduk confidently predicted his victory, but exacted their promise to proclaim him supreme god, with authority over even Anshar.

Tablet 3 
Anshar spoke to Gaga, who advised him to fetch Lahmu and Lahamu and tell them of Tiamat's war plans, and of Marduk's demand for overlordship if he defeats her. Lahmu and Lahamu and other Igigi (heavenly gods) were distressed, but drank together, becoming drowsy, and finally approving the compact with Marduk.

Tablet 4 
Marduk was given a throne, and sat over the other gods, who honored him.

Marduk was also given a sceptre and vestments, as well as weapons to fight Tiamat – bow, quiver, mace, and bolts of lightning, together with the four winds – his body was aflame.

Using the four winds Marduk trapped Tiamat. Adding a whirlwind, a cyclone, and Imhullu ("the Evil Wind"), together the seven winds stirred up Tiamat. In his war chariot drawn by four creatures he advanced. He challenged Tiamat, stating she had unrightfully made Kingu her consort, accusing her of being the source of the trouble. Enraged, Tiamat joined Marduk in single combat.

Marduk used a net, a gift from Anu, to entangle Tiamat; Tiamat attempted to swallow Marduk, but 'the Evil Wind' filled her mouth. With the winds swirling within her she became distended – Marduk then shot his arrow, hitting her heart – she was slain. The other gods attempted to flee but, Marduk captured them, broke their weapons, and netted them. Her eleven monsters were also captured and chained; whilst Kingu was taken to Uggae (the Angel of Death), the 'Tablet of Destinies' taken from him. Marduk then smashed Tiamat's head with the mace, while her blood was carried off by the North Wind.

Marduk then split Tiamat's remains in two – from one half he made the sky – in it he made places for Anu, Enlil, and Ea.

Tablet 5 

Marduk made likenesses of the gods in the constellations, and defined the days of the year from them. He created night and day, and the moon also. He created clouds and rain, and their water made the Tigris and Euphrates. He gave the 'Tablet of Destinies' to Anu.

Statues of the eleven monsters of Tiamat were made and installed at the gate of Apsu.

Tablet 6 
Marduk then spoke to Ea – saying he would use his own blood to create man – and that man would serve the gods. Ea advised one of the gods be chosen as a sacrifice – the Igigi advised that Kingu be chosen – his blood was then used to create man.

Marduk then divided the gods into "above" and "below" – three hundred in the heavens, six hundred on earth. The gods then proposed to build a throne or shrine for him – Marduk told them to construct Babylon. The gods then spent a year making bricks – they built the Esagila (Temple to Marduk) to a great height, making it a place for Marduk, Ea, and Enlil.

A banquet was then held, with fifty of the great gods taking seats. Anu praising Enlil's bow and then Marduk.

The first nine names or titles of Marduk were given.

Tablet 7 

The remainder of Marduk's fifty names or titles were read.

Colophon 

Tablets Smith examined also contained attributions on the rear of the tablet – the first tablet contained eight lines of a colophon – Smith's reconstruction and translation of this states :

Significance, interpretation, and ritual use 

The Enūma Eliš is the primary source for Mesopotamian cosmology. According to Heidel its main purpose was as a praise of Marduk, and was important in making that Babylonian god head of the entire pantheon, through his deeds in defeating Tiamat, and in creation of the universe. Heidel also considers the text to have a political as well as religious message; that is, the promotion to primacy of a Babylonian god to better justify any Babylonian influence over the whole Mesopotamian region. The text as a whole contains many words which are Sumerian in origin, including the names of Tiamat's monsters, Marduk's wind, and the name for man used is the Sumerian lullu; however the chief god in the epic is the Babylonian Marduk, and not the Sumerian Enlil.

A ritual text from the Seleucid period states that the Enūma Eliš was recited during the Akitu festival. There is scholarly debate as to whether this reading occurred, its purpose, and even the identity of the text referred to. Most analysts consider that the festival concerned and included some form of re-enactment of Tiamat's defeat by Marduk, representing a renewal cycle and triumph over chaos. However a more detailed analysis by Jonathan Z. Smith led him to argue that the ritual should be understood in terms of its post-Assyrian and post-Babylonian imperial context, and may include elements of psychological and political theater legitimizing the non-native Seleucid rulers; he also questions whether the Enūma Eliš read during that period was the same as that known to the ancient Assyrians. Whether the Enūma Eliš creation myth was created for the Akitu ritual, or vice versa, or neither, is unclear; nevertheless there are definite connections in subject matter between the myth and festival, and there is also evidence of the festival as celebrated during the neo-Babylonian period that correlates well with the Enūma Eliš myth. A version of the Enūma Eliš is also thought to have been read during the month of Kislimu.

It has been suggested that ritual reading of the poem coincided with spring flooding of the Tigris or Euphrates following the melting of snow in mountainous regions upstream – this interpretation is supported by the defeat of the (watery being) Tiamat by Marduk.

Influence on biblical research

The Enūma Eliš contains numerous parallels with passages of the Old Testament, which has led some researchers to conclude that these were based on the Mesopotamian work. Overarching similarities include: reference to a watery chaos before creation; a separation of the chaos into heaven and earth; different types of waters and their separation; as well as the numerical similarity between the seven tablets of the epic and the seven days of creation. However, another analysis  notes many differences, including polytheism vs. monotheism, and personification of forces and qualities in the Babylonian myth vs. imperative creation by God in the biblical stories; permanence of matter vs. creation out of nothing; and the lack of any real parallel for Marduk's long battles with monsters. He also notes some broad commonalities of both texts with other religions, such as a watery chaos found in Egyptian, Phoenician, and Vedic works; and that both texts were written in languages with a common Semitic root. Regarding the creation of man, there are similarities in the use of dust or clay, but man's purpose is inverted in the two texts: in the Enūma Eliš man is created as a servant of gods, whereas in Genesis man is given more agency. Nevertheless in both, the dust is infused with "godhood", either through a god's blood in the Enūma Eliš, or by being made in God's image in Genesis. As to the seven tablets and seven days of each system, the numbered itineraries in general do not closely match, but there are some commonalities in order of the creation events: first darkness, then light, the firmament, dry land, and finally man, followed by a period of rest.

Different theories have been proposed to explain the parallels.  Based on an analysis of proper names in the texts, A.T. Clay proposed that the Enūma Eliš was a combination of a Semitic myth from Amurru and a Sumerian myth from Eridu; this theory is thought to lack historical or archaeological evidence. An alternative theory posits a westward spread of the Mesopotamian myth to other cultures such as the Hebrews; additionally, the Hebrews would have been influenced by Mesopotamian culture during their Babylonian captivity. A third explanation supposes a common ancestor for both religious systems.

Conrad Hyers of the Princeton Theological Seminary suggests that Genesis, rather than adopting earlier Babylonian and other creation myths, polemically addressed them to "repudiate the divinization of nature and the attendant myths of divine origins, divine conflict, and divine ascent." According to this theory, the Enūma Eliš elaborated the interconnections between the divine and inert matter, while the aim of Genesis was to state the supremacy of the Hebrew God Yahweh Elohim over all creation (and all other deities).

The broken Enūma Eliš tablet seems to refer to a concept of sabbath. A contextual restoration contains the rarely attested Sapattum or Sabattum as the full moon, cognate or merged with Hebrew Shabbat (cf. ), but monthly rather than weekly; it is regarded as a form of Sumerian sa-bat ("mid-rest"), attested in Akkadian as um nuh libbi ("day of mid-repose"). The reconstructed text reads: "[Sa]bbath shalt thou then encounter, mid[month]ly."

The 'Ain Samiya goblet, found in a tomb near modern Ramallah, is believed to depict scenes similar to the Enūma Eliš and illustrates a clear influence from Mesopotamia on Canaan during the Middle Bronze Age. The depictions of a double headed god and the creation of the world from a dragon provide the earliest evidence of the epic's composition.

See also
Mesopotamian pantheon
Religions of the ancient Near East
Sumerian creation myth

References

Sources 

 
 
 
 
  , alt link
 
 
 
 
 
  , alt link

Further reading

External links

I.2 Poem of Creation (Enūma eliš) critical edition and translation of the text (electronic Babylonian Library).
Enuma Elish – The Babylonian Epic of Creation on Ancient History Encyclopedia (includes the original text)
, extract of English translation by W.G. Lambert reproduced at etana.org
A cuneiform text of Tablet I with translation and explanation in detail

 
18th-century BC literature
17th-century BC literature
16th-century BC literature
1849 archaeological discoveries
Creation myths
First Babylonian Empire
Mesopotamian myths
Akkadian literature
Tiamat